Knud Wedel Hvidberg (27 May 1927 – 5 May 1986) was a Danish painter and sculptor.

Biography
Born in Holstebro in central Jutland, Hvidberg was a self-taught artist. In the early 1960s, he first painted in a Constructivist style inspired by Gunnar Aagaard Andersen and other members of the Linien II artists association. His sculptural creations were mobiles made of roof gutters, plexiglass and iron driven by electric motors with shining lights. One, developed together with William Soya, also had a sound and light component, predating later installations. His 1965 POEX exhibition combined avant-garde developments in art, poetry and drama. Hvidberg sought to give his mobiles associations with the cosmos and with ancient civilisations. While in Rome in the early 1979s, he again became interested in Symbolism which had characterized his early works with crosses and swastikas.

In the 1980s, Hvidberg decorated a number of buildings including the Vordingborg Educational Centre (Vordingborg Uddannelsescenter) in 1985.

Awards
In 1972, Hvidberg was awarded the Eckersberg Medal.

References

Literature

External links
Examples of Knud Hvilberg's paintings from Kunst på arbejde
Illustrated list of Knud Hvilberg's works in Danish museums from Kunstindeks Danmark

1927 births
1986 deaths
20th-century Danish painters
People from Holstebro
Recipients of the Eckersberg Medal
20th-century Danish sculptors
Male sculptors
Danish male artists
20th-century Danish male artists